Prasinocladus is a genus of green algae in the family Chlorodendraceae.

References

External links

Chlorophyta genera
Chlorodendrophyceae